Anagumang was a legendary Yapese navigator who led an expedition in rafts and canoes five or six hundred years ago. On this expedition he discovered the islands of Palau and brought stones from Palau to Yap.

Expedition 
Anagumang hired seven men with him for his journey, with the help of his mother, Le-gerem.

Stones 
First Anagumang ordered his men to cut stone into the shape of fish, then a crescent moon, and then a full moon with a hole in it for transport. He fashioned other stones so they could be slipped onto a trunk of a betel-nut tree. The stones came in different sizes. The smallest were 7-8 centimeters long, and the longest were 3.6 meters in diameter and 0.5 meters thick and weighed four tons.

Currency 
These stones were called "Rai stones" and were also used as a form of currency. However, it was required that the stone must be proved to be made by Anagumang in order to be used as currency.

The currency was exploited by sailor David O'Keefe in the 19th century. For 30 years, he traded the stones for items such as Copra.

Studies and beliefs 

 It is believed that Anagumang worked with Fatha'an in a competition to bring money to Yap.

References

People from Yap State
Micronesian mythology
Micronesian explorers of the Pacific